Bangladesh Jamaat-e-Islami, previously known as Jamaat-e-Islami Bangladesh, or Jamaat for short, was the largest Islamist political party in Bangladesh. On 1 August 2013, the Bangladesh Supreme Court cancelled the registration of the Jamaat-e-Islami, ruling that the party is unfit to contest national elections.

Its predecessor, the party (Jamaat-e-Islami Pakistan), strongly opposed the independence of Bangladesh and break-up of Pakistan. In 1971, paramilitary forces associated with the party collaborated with the Pakistan Army in mass killings of Bangladeshi nationalists and pro-intellectuals.

Upon the independence of Bangladesh in 1971, the new government banned Jamaat-e-Islami from political participation since the government was secular and some of its leaders went into exile in Pakistan. Following the assassination of the first president and the military coup in 1975, the ban on the Jamaat was lifted and the new party Jamaat-e-Islami Bangladesh was formed. Exiled leaders were allowed to return. Abbas Ali Khan was the acting Amir of Jamaat-e-Islami Bangladesh. The Jamaat agenda is the creation of an "Islamic state" with the Sha'ria legal system, and outlawing "un-Islamic" practices and laws. For this reason, it interpretes their central political concept "Iqamat-e-Deen" as establishing Islamic state by possession of state power.

In the 1980s, the Jamaat joined the multi-party alliance for the restoration of democracy. It later allied with Ziaur Rahman's Bangladesh Nationalist Party and Jamaat leaders became ministers in the two BNP-led regimes of prime minister Begum Khaleda Zia (from 1991 to 1996 and from 2001 to 2006). Awami League also got involved with Jamaat to come to power in 1996. In 2008, it won two of 300 elected seats in Parliament. In 2010 the government, led by the Awami League, began prosecution of war crimes committed during the 1971 war under the International Crimes Tribunal. By 2012, two leaders of the BNP, one leader from Jatiyo Party and eight of Jamaat had been charged with war crimes, and by March 2013, three Jamaat leaders had been convicted of crimes. In response, the Jamaat held major strikes and protests across the country, which led to more than 60 deaths (mostly by security forces) and alleged mass destruction of public and national properties. This prompted calls from the secular community and various secular groups to ban Jamaat-e-Islami as a political party.

History

British India (1941–1947)

The Jamaat-e-Islami was founded in pre-partition British India by Syed Ab'ul Ala Maududi at Islamia Park, Lahore on 26 August 1941 as a movement to promote Social and Political Islam. Jamaat opposed the creation of a separate state of Pakistan for the Muslims of India. It also did not support the Muslim League, then the largest Muslim party, in the election of 1946. Nor did it support the "Composite Nationalism" (Muttahida Qaumiyat Aur Islam) of the Jamiat Ulama e-Hind. Maulana Abul Ala Maududi, the founder of Jamaat-e-Islami, actively worked to prevent the partition of India, arguing that concept violated the Islamic doctrine of the ummah. Maulana Maududi saw the partition as creating a temporal border that would divide Muslims from one another. He advocated for the whole of India to be reclaimed for Islam.

Pakistan period (1947–1971) 
After the creation of Pakistan, Jamaat-e-Islami divided into separate Indian and Pakistani national organisations. The East Pakistan wing of Jamaat-e-Islami Pakistan later became Bangladesh Jamaat-e-Islami.

Jammat-e-Islami participated in the democratic movement in Pakistan during the Martial Law Period declared by General Ayub Khan. An all-party democratic alliance (DAC) was formed in 1965. Jamaat head in East Pakistan, Ghulam Azam was a member of the alliance, which also included Maulana Abdul Hamid Khan Bhashani and Sheikh Mujibur Rahman.

As an Islamist party, JI was uninterested in ethnic issues or local languages but strongly supported Islamic unity, and so supported the Pakistani military in their campaign.
East Pakistan JI head Ghulam Azam coordinated the development and operation of paramilitary forces during the war, including Razakar, Al-Shams, and Al-Badr in collaboration with the Pakistan Army. These units committed the Bangladesh genocide and other war crimes at the time, most notorious of which was the systematic execution of Bengali pro-liberation intellectuals on 14 December 1971. As the war neared its end, a final effort to wipe off as many intellectuals as possible took place, to eliminate the future leaders of the new nation. On 14 December 1971, over 200 of East Pakistan's intellectuals including professors, journalists, doctors, artists, engineers, and writers were picked up from their homes in Dhaka by the Al-Badr militias. Notable novelist Shahidullah Kaiser and playwright Munier Choudhury were among the victims. They were taken blindfolded to torture cells in Mirpur, Mohammadpur, Nakhalpara, Rajarbagh and other locations in different sections of the city. Later they were executed en masse, most notably at Rayerbazar and Mirpur.

Bangladesh period (1971–present) 
Jamaat was banned after the independence of Bangladesh in December 1971, and its top leaders fled to West Pakistan. Sheikh Mujibur Rahman, the first president of Bangladesh, also cancelled the citizenship of Ghulam Azam, the leader of Jamaat-e-Islami who moved to Pakistan, the Middle East and the UK. Azam first fled to Pakistan and organised an "East Pakistan Recovery Week". As information about his participation in the killing of civilians came to light "a strong groundswell of resentment against" East Pakistan JI leadership developed and Azam and Maulan Abdur Rahim were sent to Saudi Arabia. In Saudi Arabia, Azam and some of his followers successfully appealed for donations to "defend Islam" in Bangladesh, asserting that the Hindu minority there were "killing Muslims and burning their homes."

President Sheikh Mujibur Rahman was assassinated by a small group of Bangladesh Army officers in August 1975. These post-Mujibur regimes were immediately recognised by both Saudi Arabia and Pakistan, and Jamaat-e-Islami once again resumed political activities in Bangladesh. Rahman also allowed Azam to return to Bangladesh as the leader of Jamaat-e-Islami.

After the end of military rule in 1990, mass protests began against Azam and Jamaat-e-Islami, who were accused by the protesters of committing war crimes. The protests were headed by Jahanara Imam, an author who lost her two sons and husband in the liberation war. Azam's citizenship was challenged in a case that went to the Bangladesh Supreme Court, as he held only a Pakistani passport. Absent prosecution of Azam for war crimes, the Supreme Court ruled that he had to be allowed a Bangladeshi passport and the freedom to resume his political activities.

Bangladesh police arrested Jamaat-e-Islami chief and former Industry Minister Matiur Rahman Nizami from his residence in the capital in a graft case on 19 May 2008 and was charged with war crimes in 2009. He was hanged to death on 11 May 2016. Earlier, two former Cabinet Ministers of the immediate past BNP-led alliance government, Abdul Mannan Bhuiyan and Shamsul Islam were sent to Dhaka Central Jail after they surrendered before the court.
As a result, in the parliamentary elections of December 2008, Jamaat-e-Islami garnered fewer than 5 seats out of the total 300 that constitute the national parliament. The Bangladesh Nationalist Party was concerned, as Jamaat-e-Islami had been their primary political partner in the Four-Party Alliance.

List of Ameers 

 Mawlana Muhammad Abdur Rahim (1956-1960) 
 Professor Ghulam Azam (1960-2000)
 Abbas Ali Khan (Acting)
 Motiur Rahman Nizami  (2000-2016)
 Mawlana Maqbul Ahmed (2016-2019)
 Dr. Shafiqur Rahman  (2019–Present)

Controversy

Accusations of war crimes
Many of Jamaat's leaders are accused of committing war crimes and genocide during the liberation war of Bangladesh in 1971 and several have been convicted by the International Crimes Tribunal.

International Crimes Tribunal

The International Crimes Tribunal was formed in 2009 shortly after the Awami League came to power with a view to punish its political opponent.

By November 2011, the International Crimes Tribunal had charged two BNP leaders and ten Jamaat leaders with war crimes committed during the Bangladesh liberation war and 1971 Bangladesh genocide.

Abul Kalam Azad, a nationally known Islamic cleric and former member of Jamaat, was charged with genocide, rape, abduction, confinement and torture. He was tried in absentia after having fled the country; police believe he is in Pakistan. In January 2013, Azad was the first suspect to be convicted in the trials; he was found guilty of seven of eight charges and sentenced to death by hanging. Azad's defence lawyer, a prominent Supreme Court lawyer appointed by the state, did not have any witnesses in the case; he said Azad's family failed to cooperate in helping locate witnesses and refused to testify as there was no chance of a fair trial.

The summary of verdict in the conviction of Abdul Quader Mollah recognised the role played by Jamaat-e-Islami and its student wing ('Islami Chatra Sangha') as collaborators with the Pakistan Army in 1971. The party was found guilty of forming paramilitary forces, such as Razakar and Al-Badr. It was said to have taken part in the systematic genocide of the Bangladeshi people and other violent activities.

As a result of the trials, the activists of the 2013 Shahbag Protest have demanded that the government ban Jamaat from Bangladeshi politics. In response, the government started drafting a bill to ban Jamaat-e-Islami from Bangladeshi politics.

On 28 February 2013 Delwar Hossain Sayeedi, the deputy of Jamaat, was found guilty of genocide, rape and religious persecution. He was sentenced to death by hanging. His defence lawyer had earlier complained that a witness who was supposed to testify for him was abducted from the gates of the courthouse on 5 November 2012, reportedly by police, and has not been heard from since. The government did not seem to take the issue seriously after the prosecution denied there was a problem. Point to note the security forces probably killed the witness as the entire judicial process was to simply vanish the opposition.

Muhammad Kamaruzzaman, senior assistant secretary general of Jamaat-e-Islami was indicted on 7 June 2012 on 7 counts of crimes against humanity.
On 9 May 2013, he was convicted and given the death penalty on five counts of mass killings, rape, torture and kidnapping.

Ghulam Azam, ameer of Jamaat-e-Islami Bangladesh until 2000 was found guilty by the ICT on five counts. Incitement, conspiracy, planning, abatement and failure to prevent murder. He was sentenced on 15 July 2013 to 90 years imprisonment.

Ali Ahsan Mohammad Mojaheed, Secretary General of Bangladesh Jamaat-e-Islami was sentenced to death by hanging on 22 November 2015.

Chowdhury Mueen-Uddin, who fled to the UK after the liberation of Bangladesh and a leader of the London-based Jamaat organisation Dawatul Islam, was indicted for crimes against humanity and genocide and being a leader of the Al-Badr militia. He is also accused of the murder of Bangladesh's top intellectuals during the war, although he has denied all charges.

Cancellation of registration 
On 27 January 2009, the Bangladesh Supreme Court issued a ruling after 25 people from different Islamic organisations, including Bangladesh Tariqat Federation's Secretary General Syed Rezaul Haque Chandpuri, Jaker Party's Secretary General Munshi Abdul Latif and Sammilita Islami Jote's President Maulana Ziaul Hasan, filed a joint petition. Jamaat e Islami chief Motiur Rahman Nizami, Secretary General Ali Ahsan Mujaheed and the Election Commission Secretary were given six weeks time to reply, but they did not.
The ruling asked to explain as to "why the Jamaat's registration should not be declared illegal".
As a verdict of the ruling, High Court cancelled the registration of the Jamaat-e-Islami on 1 August 2013, ruling that the party is unfit to contest national polls because its charter puts God above democratic process.

On 5 August 2013 the Supreme Court rejected Jamaat's plea against the High Court. The chamber judge of the Appellate Division Justice AHM Shamsuddin Choudhury Manik while rejecting the Jamaat's petition seeking stay on the High Court verdict, said that the Jamaat could move a regular appeal before the Appellate Division against the verdict after getting its full text.

Bangladesh Islami Chhatra Shibir 
The student wing of this organisation is the Bangladesh Islami Chhatra Shibir, a major organisation at many colleges and universities including the Chittagong College, University of Chittagong, University of Dhaka, Rajshahi University, Islamic University, Begum Rokeya University, Carmichael College etc. It is also influential in the madrassa system.
It was known as Pakistan Islami Chattra Shangha It is a member of the International Islamic Federation of Student Organisations and the World Assembly of Muslim Youth.

2013 violence

In February 2013, following the verdict by the International Crimes Tribunal (ICT), and the announcement of death sentence of Delwar Hossain Sayidee (a leader of Bangladesh Jamaat-e-Islami, during the Bangladesh liberation war of 1971), supporters of Bangladesh Jamaat-e-Islami and its student wing Islami Chhatra Shibir were involved in country-wide resistance and police killed 44 protesters and wounding 250 . More than 50 temples were damaged, and more than 1500 houses and business establishments of Hindus were torched in Gaibandha, Chittagong, Rangpur, Sylhet, Chapainawabganj, Bogra and in many other districts of the country,
By March 2013, at least 87 people killed by the government security forces. The Jamaat-e-Islami supporters called for the fall of the government.

Supporters of Jamaat and its student wing Shibir have been involved in violence. They have been accused widely from murdering opponent political party activists to instigating riot by spreading false news.

Election results

See also
 Jamaat-e-Islami Pakistan
 List of political parties in Bangladesh

References

External links
 Full verdict on Bangladesh Jamaat-e-Islami's registration cancellation
 Jamaat was 'involved in war crimes'
 Jamaat-e-Islami Manifesto
 
 Study ranks Shibir world's 3rd top armed group

 
Banned Islamist parties
Far-right political parties
Far-right politics in Bangladesh
Islamic political parties in Bangladesh
Political parties established in 1941